Șilindia is a commune in Arad County, Romania, is lies in the Crișul Alb Basin, at the northern feet of Cigherul Hills, along the river Cigher. Its total surface is 3093 hectares. It is composed of five villages: Camna (Kávna), Iercoșeni (Újárkos), Luguzău (Lugozó), Satu Mic (Dezsőháza) and Șilindia (situated at 54 km from Arad).

A 2,000-year-old Dacian treasure was found there.

Population
According to the last census, the population of the commune counts 959 inhabitants, out of which 82.8% are Romanians, 14.9% are Hungarians, 1.6% are Ukrainians and 0.7% are of other or undeclared nationalities.

History
The first documentary record of the locality Șilindia dates back to 1334. Camna was first mentioned in 1828, Iercoşeni in 1477, Luguzău in 1561 and Satu Mic in 1954.

In 1967 archaeologists found a Dacian treasure dating from the 3rd century B.C., considered one of the most important treasures found in Romania.

Economy
The economy of the commune is mainly agricultural, growing grain, fodder-plants, pomiculture, livestock-breeding and conversion of timber are well represented.

Tourism
Among the touristic sights are the wooden church in Iercoşeni and the children's camp in Camna.

References

Communes in Arad County
Localities in Crișana